Arere Anentia (1931–1979) was a long-distance runner from Kenya.

Anentia competed at the 1956 Summer Olympics, but failed to advance past 5000 metres heats. He won 3 miles at the 1958 AAA Championships
At the 1958 British Empire and Commonwealth Games, he finished third in the 6 miles race. By this result he became the first Kenyan athlete to win a medal at any intercontinental championships, together with Bartonjo Rotich, who won bronze medal over 440 Yards Hurdles. He competed at the 1960 Summer Olympics and finished 19th over 10000 metres and was to participate the marathon race, but did not start.

References

External links
Biography of Arere Anentia

1931 births
1979 deaths
Kenyan male long-distance runners
Athletes (track and field) at the 1956 Summer Olympics
Athletes (track and field) at the 1960 Summer Olympics
Olympic athletes of Kenya
Athletes (track and field) at the 1958 British Empire and Commonwealth Games
Commonwealth Games bronze medallists for Kenya
Commonwealth Games medallists in athletics
Medallists at the 1958 British Empire and Commonwealth Games